Mentor was launched in 1778 at Chester as a West Indiaman. She captured three vessels, including a valuable East Indiaman belonging to the French East India Company. She had an inconclusive single ship action with a French warship in 1779. She was wrecked in 1782.

Career
Mentor first appeared in Lloyd's Register (LR) in the volume for 1778.

War between Britain and France had broken out in April 1778. Captain John Dawson sailed Mentor south in a privateering cruise to attempt to intercept French vessels coming from the Indian Ocean that were not aware of the outbreak of hostilities. On 28 October 1778 Mentor encountered the French East Indiaman , which was sailing from India to France. Mentor captured Carnatic. When Carnatic came into Liverpool, she was said to be worth £135,000 and the richest prize ever taken and brought safe into port by a Liverpool privateer. Part of the value was due to a box of diamonds that had been found on her. Other estimates put the value of the prize at £40,000. Peter Baker, Mentors owner, retained ownership of Carnatic. Prize money was paid on 1 November 1779.

On 26 October 1779 Mentor, John Whiteside, master, was in  when she sighted four vessels, and sailed towards them. There were two ships, one flying Dutch colours and the other English, a sloop, and a schooner. As Mentor came closer Whiteside saw that one of the ships was a frigate, and sailed away. The frigate raised French colours, fired some shots, and set off in chase. The chase continued, off-and-on until 29 October, when she caught up with Mentor. At one p.m., an engagement commenced. Then at 2:10 p.m. the frigate broke off the action and sailed away. The frigate was armed with 36 guns, twenty-eight of them 12-pounders on one deck.

Late in the afternoon two privateers from Bristol, Lyon and Tyger, came up and together with Mentor they set off after the French vessel, but without consulting with Whiteside. Mentor, because of the damage to her masts, sails, and rigging, could not fully keep up. By mid-day the next day the three caught up with the frigate, and a brig. The frigate was disguised as a merchantman, as she had been when Mentor first saw her some days earlier. Lyon set off after the brig, and Tyger sailed towards the frigate, but when she got closer and realized the deception, broke off and joined Lyon.

Mentor could not keep up and sailed for Ireland. She put into Cork to refit.

A gale in the night between 1 and 2 August 1781 at Jamaica drove Mentor and a number of other vessels, including Carnatic, Gibbons, master, on shore. Although the initial expectation was that she and most of the other vessels that also were driven on shore would be gotten off, the next report had Carnatic and numerous other vessels totally lost; it was hoped that some cargo could be saved. Mentor, however, survived.

Loss
During the 1782 Central Atlantic hurricane in September 1782, Mentor foundered in the Grand Banks of Newfoundland with the loss of 31 of her 34 crew. Sarah rescued the survivors. Mentor was on a voyage from Jamaica to Liverpool, Lancashire. Captain Whiteside, his second mate, and a boy were the three survivors.

Notes

Citations

References
 
 

1778 ships
Age of Sail merchant ships of England
Privateer ships of Great Britain
Maritime incidents in 1781
Maritime incidents in 1782